Miss Teen USA 1987, the 5th Miss Teen USA pageant, was televised live from El Paso Civic Center, El Paso, Texas on July 21, 1987.  At the conclusion of the final competition, Kristi Lynn Addis of Mississippi was crowned by outgoing queen Allison Brown of Oklahoma.

This was the only year that the pageant was held in El Paso.  It would not return to Texas until Miss Teen USA 1997, the first of three years it was held on South Padre Island. The 1987 event was hosted by Michael Young, with colour commentary from Tracy Scoggins.

Results

Placements

Final competition scores

 Winner 
 First runner-up
 Second runner-up 
 Third runner-up
 Fourth runner-up

Special awards

Background music
Opening Number: "I Wonder Who's Out Tonight" by The Burns Sisters (Cover version)

Historical significance 
 Mississippi wins competition for the first time. Also becoming in the 5th state who wins Miss Teen USA.
 North Carolina earns the 1st runner-up position for the first time. 
 Louisiana earns the 2nd runner-up position for the first time.
 Oklahoma earns the 3rd runner-up position for the first time.
 North Dakota earns the 4th runner-up position for the first time.
 States that placed in semifinals the previous year were Louisiana, New York and Oklahoma. All of them made their second consecutive placement.
 Georgia, North Carolina and North Dakota last placed in 1985.
 California last placed in 1983.
 District of Columbia placed for the first time.
 Massachusetts placed for the first time.
 Mississippi placed for the first time.
 Texas breaks an ongoing streak of placements since 1983.

Judges
Randy Gardner
Sharyn Skeeter
Michael Maron
Kelly Hu - Miss Teen USA 1985 from Hawaii
Michael John
Cptn. Terry Jones
John H. Brennan
Ramon Sheen
Adele Lawfor
Dean Devlin
Tai Babilonia

Delegates
The Miss Teen USA 1987 delegates were:

 Alabama - Elizabeth Woodman
 Alaska - Lauren Straubb
 Arizona - Julie Hodges
 Arkansas - Paige Yandell
 California - Angi Aylor - Age: 15
 Colorado - Nicki Anselmo
 Connecticut - Allison Barbeau-Diorio
 Delaware - Christi Griffen
 District of Columbia - Ni'Cole Bobbitt - Age: 17
 Florida - Kimberlee Edwards
 Georgia - Hope Allen - Age: 16
 Hawaii - Leslie-Ann Lum
 Idaho - Luanne Relyea
 Illinois - Danielle Reese
 Indiana - Terri Salmon
 Iowa - Jan Hoyer
 Kansas - Stephanie Resnick
 Kentucky - Tracey Marsee
 Louisiana - Bobbie Brown - Age: 17
 Maine - Donna Stevenson
 Maryland - Renee Rebstock
 Massachusetts - Kristen Mastroianni - Age: 16
 Michigan - Elena Hall
 Minnesota - Karin Hargroves
 Mississippi - Kristi Addis - Age: 16
 Missouri - Sherri Garner
 Montana - Andrea Madsen
 Nebraska - Susan Weikel
 Nevada - Terri Broca
 New Hampshire - Cara Daras
 New Jersey - Tara Eldridge
 New Mexico - Samantha Owen
 New York -  Michelle Kelenski - Age: 18
 North Carolina - Peggy Blackwell - Age: 17
 North Dakota - Dayna Decker - Age: 17
 Ohio - Christy Hoyt
 Oklahoma - RaeLynn Coffman - Age: 17
 Oregon - Kasey Weisiger
 Pennsylvania - Tracy Reed
 Rhode Island -  Raye-Anne Johnson
 South Carolina - Carol Carver
 South Dakota - Camille Varland
 Tennessee - Shannon Castle
 Texas - Richelle Kesling
 Utah - Tiffany DeMille
 Vermont - Christy Beltrami
 Virginia - Kristi Pearce
 Washington - Johna Sainsbury
 West Virginia - Cheryl Cullop
 Wisconsin - Barbara Nelson
 Wyoming - Kim Roberts

Historical significance
Massachusetts, Mississippi and the District of Columbia placed for the first time.  The District of Columbia would not place again until Miss Teen USA 2000.
This was North Carolina's highest placement in the competition, a record which would not be equalled until when Melissa Lingafelt placed first runner-up at Miss Teen USA 2006.
This was the first time in the history of the competition that Texas did not make the semi-finals; this broke a four-year streak of placements by the state.

Contestant notes
Kristen Mastroianni (Massachusetts) later won the Miss Massachusetts USA 1995 title and competed in the Miss USA 1995 pageant, where she made the semi-finals.  She is one of only a few women who have made the semi-finals in both pageants.
Others who later competed at Miss USA were:
Paige Yandell (Arkansas) - Miss Arkansas USA 1989
Allison Barbeau-Diorio (Connecticut) - Miss Connecticut USA 1990
Renee Rebstock (Maryland) - Miss Maryland USA 1992
Jan Hoyer (Iowa) - Miss Iowa USA 1993 (semi-finalist at Miss USA 1993)
Christy Beltrami (Vermont) - Miss Vermont USA 1994
RayeAnne Johnson (Rhode Island) - Miss Rhode Island USA 1994

References

1987
1987 in Texas
1987 beauty pageants